Invermere Airport  is located  northeast of Invermere, British Columbia, Canada on the Shuswap Indian Band Reserve.

As described in the Canada Flight Supplement it is a Prior Permission Required airport. Landing fees are only applicable to commercial aircraft.

In the summer months there can be heavy glider activity from Invermere Soaring Centre. Babin Air is the local air operator and Approved Maintenance Organization (AMO) offering scenic, charter flights and maintenance.

Activities

Gliding
Invermere Soaring Centre
Canadian Rockies Soaring Club

References

External links
Invermere Airport
Babin Air

Registered aerodromes in British Columbia
Regional District of East Kootenay